River Trail (also known as Parallel JavaScript) is an open-source software engine designed by Intel for executing JavaScript code using parallel computing on multi-core processors.

River Trail was announced at the Intel Developer Forum in September 2011, and demonstrated using a Firefox extension developed by Intel. Brendan Eich, the original author of JavaScript, promised that he would promote River Trail within Ecma International, saying "The demo shows a 15x speedup over serial JavaScript. It lights up the ridiculously parallel hardware in modern CPUs and GPUs, for audio, video, image processing, automated voice response, computer vision, 3D gaming, etc. – all written in memory-safe, clean, functional JavaScript, without threads and their data races and deadlocks." Because River Trail leverages Intel's OpenCL SDK  it can exploit multiple CPU cores as well as data parallel instructions (ex. AVX, SSE) and the speedup can be greater than the CPU core count would imply.

A native implementation of River Trail in Firefox's SpiderMonkey JavaScript engine was announced in September 2012 and was added to nightly Firefox builds in April 2013. By January 2015, the code had been removed from Firefox.

Operation 
To use the engine scripts uses a special API, based on three pillars: a type called ParallelArray, several methods of Prototype of ParallelArray, and elementary functions.

References

External links
 Tour of the SpiderMonkey Parallel JS Implementation: Part 1; Part 2
 InfoQ interview: Rick Hudson on Parallel JavaScript (RiverTrail)
 Proposed Parallel EcmaScript API
 mozilla.dev.tech.js-engine.rivertrail discussion group
 RiverTrail source on GitHub

Intel software
JavaScript engines